India's Global Powerhouses - How They Are Taking on the World is a 2009 book by Nirmalya Kumar.  The book discusses the success of some of the largest commercial companies in India.

Content
India's Global Powerhouses informs readers about the 2009 contemporary phenomenon of Indian private firms becoming multinational and discusses common attributes of smaller multinational India-based companies.

Companies profiled
The book profiles some Indian companies, including the following:

 ArcelorMittal
 Infosys
 Bharat Forge
 Essel Propack
 Hindalco
 Mahindra & Mahindra
 Hidesign
 Marico
 Godrej
 VIP Industries
 United Breweries Group
 Suzlon
 Tata Group

References

Books about the economy of India
Books about multinational companies